The 1959 Oregon Webfoots football team represented the University of Oregon during the 1959 NCAA University Division football season. Following the disbandment of the Pacific Coast Conference in the spring of 1959, Oregon was an independent for the next five seasons, then joined the successor conference (AAWU) in 1964. In their ninth season under head coach Len Casanova, the Webfoots compiled an 8–2 record and outscored their opponents, 209 to 113. The team divided its home schedule between Hayward Field in Eugene and Multnomah Stadium in Portland.

The team's statistical leaders included Dave Grosz with 865 passing yards, Dave Powell with 495 rushing yards, and Greg Altenhofen with 240 receiving yards.

Schedule

References

External links
 Game program: Oregon at Washington State – November 14, 1959

Oregon
Oregon Ducks football seasons
Oregon Webfoots football